Denmark and the Netherlands played a two match Women's One Day International cricket series in July 1997. The series was hosted  in Germany. Netherlands won the series 2–0. Both matches were played at the Mikkelberg-Kunst-und-Cricket Center.

Series

References 

Women's international cricket matches
1997 in women's cricket
1997 in Dutch sport
1997 in Danish sport
Cricket
Denmark women's national cricket team
Denmark in Germany
Germany in international cricket